National Integration Party (in Spanish: Partido de Integración Nacional), was a political party in Peru founded in 1982 by Miguel Ángel Mufarech. PADIN assembled dissident sectors of Popular Action and PPC. It contested the municipal elections of 1983 alone, and in 1985 it contested the general elections on the list of IU.

Political parties established in 1982
Defunct political parties in Peru
1982 establishments in Peru